Gwiazda (Polish for “Star”) was a weekly newspaper published in Philadelphia, Pennsylvania in Polish from 1902 to 1985, with an English section gradually introduced, starting in 1958.

The founder and publisher was the Polish-born Stephan Nowaczyk, a printer who immigrated to Philadelphia in the 1870s and started the newspaper in 1902 in his home in Port Richmond with used equipment.  When he died in 1923, his wife, Francis, became the publisher, until 1935, when their daughter, Gertrude, became the last publisher, until 1985 when the paper was dissolved.

References

Defunct newspapers of Philadelphia
Polish-language newspapers published in the United States
Polish-American culture in Pennsylvania
Publications established in 1902
Publications disestablished in 1985
Non-English-language newspapers published in Pennsylvania